This is a list of valleys of Australia.

New South Wales
The Geographical Names Board of New South Wales lists 37 valleys in the Geographical Names Register (GNR) of NSW.

 Arbon Vale
 Babbage Ravine
 Bindra Basin
 Bromley Basin
 Brumby Pass
 Capertee Valley
 Cedar Valley
 Edies Glen
 Erskine Valley
 Glenfinlass
 Glenworth Valley
 Jamison Valley
 Jerrawangala Valley
 Kangaroo Valley
 Kanimbla Valley
 Kedumba Valley
 Kemps Valley
 Ladysmith Glen
 Luminous Valley
 Lyrebird Glen
 Megalong Valley
 Monolith Valley
 Old Mans Valley
 Orara Valley
 Queen Charlottes Vale
 Sidmouth Valley
 Stoddarts Valley
 Tam O'Shanters Glen
 Three Mile Glen
 Uargon Valley
 Valley of The Shadows
 Valley of The Swamps
 Water Nymphs Dell
 Wattley Hollow
 Whalania Deep
 Wolgan Valley
 Yarramalong Valley

Although not included in the Geographical Names Register, the following are also valleys in New South Wales:
Berowra Valley
Brindabella Valley
Bylong Valley
Grose Valley
Hunter Valley - Technically the Hunter Valley is not a single valley but a series of interlinking valleys forming a single region known formally as the Hunter Region.
Macquarie Valley (Shellharbour)
Tweed Valley

Northern Territory
Palm Valley

Queensland
Boyne Valley
Currumbin Valley
Fassifern Valley
Goldsborough Valley
Lockyer Valley
Numinbah Valley
Samford Valley
Tallebudgera Valley

South Australia
Aroona Valley
Barossa Valley
Clare Valley
Eden Valley
Inman Valley
Kenton Valley
Second Valley

Tasmania
Placenames Tasmania, the official nomenclature agency of Tasmania, lists 516 geographic entities classed as 'valleys' and 164 with the name of Valley.
Coal River Valley
Cradle Valley
Derwent Valley
Fingal Valley
Huon Valley
Meander Valley
Styx Valley
Tamar Valley
Upper Florentine Valley
Weld Valley

Victoria
Goulburn Valley
Indigo Valley
King Valley
La Trobe Valley

Western Australia
Blackwood Valley
Helena Valley
Swan Valley

See also

List of rivers of Australia

References

 
Valleys
Australia